Claas Mertens (born 2 January 1992) is a German lightweight rower. He won a gold medal at the 2015 World Rowing Championships in Aiguebelette with the lightweight men's eight. He also won ten German National Championship titles. In 2018 Mertens represented Oxford in the Oxford-Cambridge Boat Race. He was educated at Shrewsbury School then Harvard University, University of St. Gallen and Christ Church, Oxford.

References

1992 births
Living people
German male rowers
World Rowing Championships medalists for Germany
People educated at Shrewsbury School